Ophthalmotilapia nasuta is a species of cichlid endemic to Lake Tanganyika.  It can reach a length of  TL.  It can also be found in the aquarium trade.

References

nasuta
Fish described in 1962
Taxa named by Hubert Matthes
Taxa named by Max Poll
Taxonomy articles created by Polbot